The Gebo Cemetery, in Carbon County, Montana near Fromberg, Montana, was established in 1899 to serve the coal mining town of Gebo, Montana, which had population of 500 to 1,000 in the early 1900s, but was virtually abandoned after the Gebo Mine ceased operation in 1912.  It was listed on the National Register of Historic Places in 1993.

The cemetery has about 200 graves. It "is on a gentle slope overgrown with sagebrush, sparse grasses and thistle. This location affords a dramatic and panoramic view of the Clarks Fork of the Yellowstone River Valley to the east and town of Fromberg to the southeast. Steep sandstone cliffs rise to the west. The square plot includes 3.25 acres of land and is encompassed by a wire and post fence; an ornate wire gate set between tall metal trusses is on the west. A 2.09 acre plot was added to the historic cemetery in 1963, but this area has yet to be used as a burial site."

It includes three iron crosses, which were "grave markers associated with German-Russian Catholics who emigrated from the Black Sea region of Russia. The most distinguished of these is an iron cross with tracery and metal wording in German. It marks the grave of German immigrant Adam Heiser who died in 1916. Three other plots have concrete headstones embedded with bits of colored glass; at least two of these are also associated with German-Russian immigrants."

References

Cemeteries on the National Register of Historic Places in Montana
National Register of Historic Places in Carbon County, Montana
Buildings and structures completed in 1899